KGJT-CD, virtual and UHF digital channel 27, is a low-powered, Class A MyNetworkTV-affiliated television station licensed to Grand Junction, Colorado, United States and serving Colorado's Western Slope region. Owned by Nexstar Media Group, it is a sister station to CBS affiliate KREX-TV (channel 5); Nexstar also operates Fox affiliate KFQX (channel 4) under a shared services agreement (SSA) with owner Mission Broadcasting. The three stations share studios on Hillcrest Avenue in downtown Grand Junction; KGJT-CD's transmitter is located at Land's End, east of the city.

History
The station signed on for the first time on January 5, 1995, originally affiliated with Fox, until that network moved to the newly established KFQX in June 2000, in which the station would affiliate with UPN, and stayed with that network until that network folded in September 2006. After KGJT's subsequent affiliation with the new MyNetworkTV programming service, its programming became available on KREX-TV's digital signal.

On January 20, 2008 at approximately 8:45 a.m., a fire knocked KREX, KFQX and KGJT off the air. The station's building and 50 years worth of archives were a total loss. Following the fire, KGJT began to simulcast KREX-TV's signal, except for Colorado Rockies baseball games on Sundays. KGJT resumed a separate schedule with MyNetworkTV programming towards the end of 2008.

KGJT airs newscasts from its sister station, KREX-TV. The simulcasts only include the weekday morning newscast (5–7 a.m.)

Digital channels
The station's digital signal is multiplexed:

References

External links
KREX-TV Official website

MyNetworkTV affiliates
GJT-CD
Low-power television stations in the United States
Television channels and stations established in 1995
1995 establishments in Colorado
Nexstar Media Group